Srinivasa Rao or Sreenivasa Rao (Telugu: శ్రీనివాసరావు) is a masculine given name, commonly used in India. It is formed by combining Srinivas and Rao.

 Bhimaneni Srinivasa Rao, Indian film director
 Chittajallu Srinivasa Rao (1924–2004), Indian film actor, writer and director
 Ganta Srinivasa Rao (born 1960), Indian politician
 Inturi Srinivasa Rao or Vasu Inturi, Indian actor and comedian
 Kolachalam Srinivasa Rao (1854–1919), Indian writer
 Kota Srinivasa Rao (born 1943), Indian actor and politician
 Sreenivasa Rao Jammalamadaka (born 1944), American statistician
 Modiyam Srinivasa Rao (born 1967), Indian politician
 Muttamsetti Srinivasa Rao (born 1967), Indian politician
 Nittoor Srinivasa Rau or Nittur Srinivasa Rao (1903 – 2004)
 Singeetam Srinivasa Rao (born 1931), Indian filmmaker
 Srirangam Srinivasa Rao or Sri-Sri (1910–1983), Indian poet and lyricist
 Srinivasa IV Rao Sahib (1904 – 1989), Indian ruler 
 Valluri Srinivasa Rao (born 1981), Indian weightlifter 

Masculine given names